Battle of Britain is a 1969 British war film directed by Guy Hamilton, and produced by Harry Saltzman and S. Benjamin Fisz. The film documents the events of the Battle of Britain. The film drew many respected British actors to accept roles as key figures of the battle, including Laurence Olivier as Air Chief Marshal Sir Hugh Dowding, Trevor Howard as Air Vice-Marshal Keith Park, and Patrick Wymark as Air Vice-Marshal Trafford Leigh-Mallory. It also starred Michael Caine, Christopher Plummer, and Robert Shaw as Squadron Leaders. The script by James Kennaway and Wilfred Greatorex was based on the book The Narrow Margin by Derek Wood and Derek Dempster.

The film endeavoured to be an accurate account of the Battle of Britain, when in the summer and autumn of 1940 the British RAF inflicted a strategic defeat on the Luftwaffe and so ensured the cancellation of Operation Sea Lion, Adolf Hitler's plan to invade Britain. The film is notable for its spectacular flying sequences. It was on a far larger scale than had been seen on film before, and this made the film's production very expensive.

Plot

During the Battle of France in June 1940, RAF pilots evacuate a small airfield in advance of the German Blitzkrieg. The pilots, along with British and French military, leave just as German aircraft arrive and execute a heavy strafing attack. RAF Air Chief Marshal Hugh Dowding, realising that an imminent invasion of Great Britain will require every available aircraft and airman to counter it, stops additional aircraft being deployed to France so that they are available to defend Britain. In the next dramatic scene, French civilians watch in grim despair as a convoy of German troops marches into France and takes control.

At the deserted beaches of Dunkirk, the BBC reports British Prime Minister Winston Churchill's declaration that "what General Weygand called the 'Battle of France' is over. The Battle of Britain is about to begin." Luftwaffe Inspector-General Field Marshal Milch arrives to inspect a large German airfield in captured France. Hundreds of Heinkel He 111 bomber aircraft are stationed under Luftwaffe General Kesselring's command.

Luftwaffe commanders are stunned when the Führer informs them that the British are not their "natural enemy" and delays their attack while attempting a diplomatic settlement. In neutral Switzerland, the German ambassador, Baron von Richter), officially proposes new peace terms to his British counterpart, Sir David Kelly, stating that continuing to fight the "masters" of Europe is hopeless. Kelly's brave retort, "Don't threaten or dictate to us until you're marching up Whitehall ... and even then we won't listen", is followed by a private comment to his wife that von Richter is probably correct. In England, commanders celebrate their good fortune, using the delay to build up their strength and continually train their pilots and ground controllers.

The wait finally ends when Luftwaffe pilots receive orders to move to the front, where troops are preparing for a sea-borne invasion. The campaign begins with the Luftwaffe launching an early morning assault on "Eagle Day". The plan is to destroy the RAF on the ground before they have time to launch their Spitfire and Hurricane fighters.

Eagle Day proves highly successful, with attacks on British radar installations by Stuka dive bombers. Two radar stations at Ventnor and Dover are put out of action and a number of British airfields are damaged or destroyed, but British losses are relatively light. A grueling battle of attrition ensues, with the RAF airfields under repeated attack while inflicting heavy, but non-critical, damage on the attacking forces.

Adding to the RAF's problems is a battle between the commanding officers of 11 Group, Keith Park, and 12 Group, Trafford Leigh-Mallory. 12 Group is tasked with protecting 11 Group's airfields while 11 Group meets the enemy, but in raid after raid 12 Group aircraft are nowhere to be seen. Called to meet Dowding, Leigh-Mallory explains that the "Big Wing" tactic takes time for form up, while Park complains that the tactic simply is not working. Dowding ends the debate noting a critical shortage of pilots, wearily remarking, "We're fighting for survival, and losing."

The turning point occurs when a squadron of German bombers becomes lost in bad weather at night and drops bombs on London. In retaliation, the RAF attacks Berlin. Though the damage is negligible, an enraged Adolf Hitler publicly orders London to be razed. Hermann Göring arrives in France to personally command the attack, confident that the end of the battle nears. Their first attack skirts the RAF, who are still defending their airfields to the south, and they bomb unopposed. Night time attacks follow and London burns.

One of the film's most poignant scenes takes place during the Blitz. Non-commissioned fighter pilot Andy Moore comes home on leave and is furious to discover that his family have returned to London from their place of evacuation. Meeting them in a church during a raid, he gives his children presents of model aeroplanes, and tells his wife she must return them to the country at once. As they argue, an ARP warden arrives with news of a family trapped in a burning house. Andy goes to help but when he returns, the church has been reduced to a flaming ruin, leaving his wife and children dead.

Meanwhile, to supplement Commonwealth forces, the RAF has been forming units of foreign pilots who have escaped German-occupied countries. The main difficulty is their lack of English-language skills. While on a training flight, a Free Polish Air Force squadron accidentally runs into an unescorted flight of German bombers. Ignoring the commands of their British training officer, they peel off one by one and shoot down several of the bombers with unorthodox aggressive tactics. Park rewards them by elevating them to operational status, leading Dowding to do the same for the Canadian and Czech squadrons as well.

While discussing the day's events, Park and Dowding examine the German switch to London. Given a respite, Park notes that he will be able to repair his airfields and bring his squadrons back to full strength. Dowding adds that 12 Group units north of London are now all within range, while enemy fighters are at the extreme edge of their own range. He concludes that "turning on London could be the Germans' biggest blunder."

The next German daytime raid is met by a massive response; watching his formations build up in 11 Group's operations room, Wing Commander Willoughby wryly states "this should give them something to think about." RAF fighters arranged into large groups attack en masse, overwhelming the German raids. Luftwaffe losses are now critical and Göring is incensed, ordering his fighters remain with the bombers, an order the pilots hate because it robs them of the mobility required to keep the British squadrons off the German bombers. Losses continue to mount on both sides.

The climactic air battle of 15 September 1940 arrives, with Winston Churchill in attendance at 11 Group's operations room. In the underground bunker, British ground control personnel order every squadron into the air to meet the massive attack. Intense combat in the sky over London follows, with both sides taking heavy losses. The outcome is so confused that Dowding refuses to comment on the events.

The next day the RAF anxiously await a raid that never comes. Likewise the Luftwaffe is disheartened by heavy losses and also await orders that never come to resume raiding. Two German anti-aircraft gunners, who had earlier observed a French port teeming with Kriegsmarine vessels and landing barges, now observe a deserted harbour basin. Göring leaves the front, accusing his commanders of betrayal. Dowding looks out over the gardens and up to the sky where the words of Winston Churchill appear onscreen: "Never in the field of human conflict was so much owed by so many to so few."

Cast
The Battle of Britain has a large all-star international cast. The film was notable for its attempt to accurately portray the role of the Germans, with participants in the battle including Group Captain Tom Gleave, Wing Commander Robert Stanford Tuck, Squadron Leader Bolesław Drobiński and Luftwaffe Generalleutnant Adolf Galland involved as consultants. During the war, Drobiński had heavily damaged Galland's plane and forced him into a crash-landing.

Subtitled German-speaking actors were utilised, a departure from other English language British films in the postwar period, where Germans were often played by Anglophone actors.

British Commonwealth and Allies
 Harry Andrews as Harold Balfour, Under-Secretary of State for Air
 Michael Caine as Squadron Leader Canfield
 Trevor Howard as Air Vice-Marshal Keith Park, Air Officer Commanding No. 11 Group RAF
 Ian McShane as Sergeant Pilot Andy Moore
 Kenneth More as Group Captain Barker, Station Commander at RAF Duxford
 Laurence Olivier as Air Chief Marshal Sir Hugh Dowding, Air Officer Commanding-in-Chief RAF, Fighter Command
 Nigel Patrick as Group Captain Hope
 Christopher Plummer as Squadron Leader Colin Harvey, a Canadian pilot in the Royal Air Force 
 Michael Redgrave as Air Vice-Marshal Douglas Evill, Senior Air Staff Officer Fighter Command
 Ralph Richardson as Sir David Kelly, British Ambassador to Switzerland
 Robert Shaw as Squadron Leader "Skipper" 
 Patrick Wymark as Air Vice-Marshal Trafford Leigh-Mallory, Air Officer Commanding No. 12 Group RAF
 Susannah York as Section Officer Maggie Harvey, Colin's wife
 John Baskcomb as Farmer
 Michael Bates as Warrant Officer Warwick
 Isla Blair as Moore's wife
 Tom Chatto as Willoughby's Assistant Controller
 James Cosmo as Jamie
 Robert Flemyng as Wing Commander Willoughby
 Barry Foster as Squadron Leader Edwards
 Edward Fox as Pilot Officer Archie
 Bill Foxley as Squadron Leader Evans
 David Griffin as Sergeant Pilot Chris
 Jack Gwillim as Senior Air Staff Officer
 Myles Hoyle as Peter
 Duncan Lamont as Flight Sergeant Arthur
 Sarah Lawson as Skipper's wife
 Mark Malicz as Pasco
 André Maranne as French NCO
 Anthony Nicholls as Minister
 Nicholas Pennell as Simon
 Andrzej Scibor as Ox
 Jean Wladon as Jean Jacques
 Nick Tate as RAF Pilot (Uncredited)

Germans and Axis
 Curd Jürgens as Maximilian Baron von Richter, German Ambassador to Great Britain 
 Hein Riess as Reichsmarschall Hermann Göring, the Commander-in-Chief of the Luftwaffe 
 Dietrich Frauboes as Generalfeldmarschall Erhard Milch, Inspector General of the Luftwaffe
 Peter Hager as Generalfeldmarschall Albert Kesselring, Commander of Luftflotte 2
 Wilfried von Aacken as Generalmajor Theo Osterkamp, Jagdfliegerführer 2
 Karl-Otto Alberty as Generaloberst Hans Jeschonnek, Chief of Staff of the Luftwaffe
 Wolf Harnisch as Generalmajor Johannes Fink, Commander of Kampfgeschwader 2
 Malte Petzel as Oberst Beppo Schmid, Head of Luftwaffe's Military Intelligence Branch
 Manfred Reddemann as Major Falke 
 Paul Neuhaus as Major Föhn
 Alexander Allerson as Major Brandt
 Alf Jungermann as Lieutenant Froedl, Brandt's navigator
 Helmut Kirchner as Boehm
 Reinhard Horras as Bruno
 Rolf Stiefel as Adolf Hitler

Production
Former participants of the battle served as technical advisers including Douglas Bader, James Lacey, Robert Stanford Tuck, Adolf Galland and Dowding himself.

Aircraft 

The film required a large number of period aircraft. In September 1965 producers Harry Saltzman and S. Benjamin Fisz contacted former RAF Bomber Command Group Captain T.G. 'Hamish' Mahaddie to find the aircraft and arrange their use. Eventually 100 aircraft were employed, called the "35th largest air force in the world". With Mahaddie's help, the producers located 109 Spitfires in the UK, of which 27 were available although only 12 could be made flyable. Mahaddie negotiated use of six Hawker Hurricanes, of which three were flying. The film helped preserve these aircraft, including a rare Spitfire Mk II which had been a gate guardian at RAF Colerne in Wiltshire.

During the actual aerial conflict, all RAF Spitfires were Spitfire Mk I and Mark II variants. However, only one Mk Ia and one Mk IIa (the latter with a Battle of Britain combat record) could be made airworthy, so the producers had to use seven other different marks, all of them built later in the war. To achieve commonality, the production made some modifications to "standardise" the Spitfires, including adding elliptical wingtips, period canopies and other changes. To classic aircraft fans, they became known as "Mark Haddies" (a play on Grp. Capt. Mahaddie's name).

A pair of two-seat trainer Spitfires were camera platforms to achieve realistic aerial footage inside the battle scenes. Lieutenant Maurice Hynett, RN, on leave from duties at Royal Aircraft Establishment, Farnborough flew a number of Spitfire sequences in the film, including one of the opening scenes which features a single Spitfire in flight. A rare Hawker Hurricane XII had been restored by Canadian Bob Diemert, who flew the aircraft in the film. Eight non-flying Spitfires and two Hurricanes were set dressing, with one Hurricane able to taxi.

A North American B-25 Mitchell N6578D, flown by pilots John "Jeff" Hawke and Duane Egli, was the primary filming platform for the aerial sequences. It was fitted with camera positions in what were formerly the aircraft's nose, tail and waist gun positions. An additional camera, on an articulating arm, was mounted in the aircraft's bomb bay and allowed 360-degree shots from below the aircraft. The top gun turret was replaced with a clear dome for the aerial director, who would co-ordinate the other aircraft by radio.

N6578D was painted garishly for line-up references and to make it easier for pilots to determine which way it was manoeuvring.  When the brightly coloured aircraft arrived at Tablada airbase in Spain in early afternoon of 18 March 1968, the comment from Derek Cracknell, the assistant director, was "It's a bloody great psychedelic monster!" The aircraft was henceforth dubbed the Psychedelic Monster.

For the German aircraft, the producers obtained 32 CASA 2.111 twin-engined bombers, a Spanish-built version of the German Heinkel He 111H-16. They also located 27 Hispano Aviación HA-1112 M1L 'Buchon' single-engined fighters, a Spanish version of the German Messerschmitt Bf 109. The Buchons were altered to look more like correct Bf 109Es, adding mock machine guns and cannon, and redundant tailplane struts, and removing the rounded wingtips. The Spanish aircraft were powered by British Rolls-Royce Merlin engines, and thus almost all the aircraft used, British and German alike, were Merlin-powered.  After the film, one HA-1112 was donated to the German Luftwaffenmuseum der Bundeswehr, and converted to a Messerschmitt Bf 109 G-2 variant, depicting the insignias of German ace Gustav Rödel.

Two Heinkels and the 17 flyable Messerschmitts (including one dual-controlled HA-1112-M4L two-seater, used for conversion training and as a camera ship), were flown to England to complete the shoot. In the scene where the Polish training squadron breaks off to attack (the "Repeat, please" sequence), the three most distant Hurricanes were Buchons marked as Hurricanes, as there were not enough flyable Hurricanes. In addition to the combat aircraft, two Spanish-built Junkers Ju 52 transports were used.

Locations

Filming in England was at Duxford, Debden, North Weald and Hawkinge, all operational stations in 1940; one surviving First World War "Belfast" hangar at Duxford was blown up and demolished for the Eagle Day sequence. Some filming also took place at Bovingdon, a former wartime bomber airfield. Some aerial shots were also taken over the former RAF Sywell (now Sywell Aerodrome). The title sequence scene, showing a review of German bombers on the ground by Fieldmarshal Milch, was filmed at Tablada Airfield in Spain. Stunt coordinator Wilson Connie Edwards retained a Mark IX Spitfire, six Buchons, and a P-51 Mustang in lieu of payment, which were stored in Texas until sold to collectors in 2014.

The village of Chilham in Kent became the base of operations for the radio controllers in the film.
Denton, another Kent village, and its pub, The Jackdaw Inn, features in the film as the location where Christopher Plummer and his on-screen wife argue about her relocating closer to his posting. The Jackdaw Inn has a room devoted to an extensive collection of RAF Second World War memorabilia.

Many of the scenes in the film were filmed in Spain. Among these scenes was the Dunkirk recreation, which was shot at the beachfront in Huelva, Spain.  To reflect the cloudless skies of summer of 1940, many upward-facing shots were filmed over Spain, while downward-facing shots were almost all below the clouds, over southern England, where farmland is distinctive. However, 1940 camouflage made it difficult to see the aircraft against the ground and sky, so a cloud background was used where possible. Only one Spitfire was relocated to Spain to stand in for the RAF defenders. After filming began, the English weather proved too unreliable and filming was moved to Hal Far and Luqa Airfields in Malta to complete the aerial sequences.

Numerous scenes were shot in the preserved operations rooms, illustrating the operation of the Dowding system that controlled the fighter squadrons. Much of this footage takes place in 11 Group's operations room, today preserved as the Battle of Britain Bunker. Other scenes take place in Fighter Command's central "filter room" as well as recreations of the squadron ops rooms. One scene shows the hit on Biggin Hill's ops room, and another shows its relocation to a local bakery, although this is a recreation of another squadron's backup room in a local butcher's shop.

Location filming in London was carried out mainly in the St Katharine Docks area where older houses were being demolished for housing estates. Partly demolished buildings represented bombed houses and disused buildings were set on fire. St Katharine Docks was one of the few areas of London's East End to survive the Blitz. Many extras were survivors of the Blitz. Aldwych tube station, used as a wartime air-raid shelter, was also used as a filming location.

Almost all the period equipment from the London Fire Brigade Museum was used in the film. The night scenes of wartime Berlin were filmed in Donostia-San Sebastian, Spain.
Production gaffers were allowed to blackout the city on demand, with health facilities and official buildings backed up with generators.
The scenes at RAF Fighter Command were filmed at RAF Bentley Priory, the headquarters of Fighter Command. Air Chief Marshal Hugh Dowding's original office, with the original furniture, was used.

Aircraft models
Permission was granted to the producers to use the Royal Air Force Museum's Junkers Ju 87 Stuka dive-bomber (one of only two that survive intact). The 1943 aircraft was repainted and slightly modified to resemble a 1940 model Ju 87. The engine was found to be in excellent condition and there was little difficulty in starting it, but returning the aircraft to airworthiness was ultimately too costly for the filmmakers. Instead, two Percival Proctor training aircraft were converted into half-scale Stukas, with a cranked wing, as "Proctukas" though, in the film, they were not used on-screen. Instead, to duplicate the steep dive of Ju 87 attacks, large models were flown by radio control.

To recreate airfield scenes, with the limited number of period aircraft available for the film, large scale models were used. The first requirement was for set decoration replicas. Production of full-size wood and fibreglass Hurricanes, Spitfires and Bf 109s commenced in a sort of production line set up at Pinewood Studios. A number of the replicas were fitted with motorcycle engines to enable them to taxi. Although most of these replicas were destroyed during filming, a small number were made available to museums in the UK.

The other need was for models in aerial sequences, and art director and model maker John Siddall was asked by the producer to create and head a team specifically for this because of his contacts in the modelling community.  A test flight was arranged at Lasham Airfield in the UK and a model was flown down the runway close behind a large American estate car with a cameraman in the rear.  This test proved successful, leading to many radio-controlled models being constructed in the band rehearsal room at Pinewood Studios.

Over a period of two years, a total of 82 Spitfires, Hurricanes, Messerschmitts, and He 111s were built. Radio-controlled Heinkel He 111 models were flown to depict bombers being destroyed over the English Channel. When reviewing the footage of the first crash, the producers noticed a trailing-wire antenna; this was explained by an added cutaway in which the control wires of a Heinkel are seen shot loose.

Releases
The quote from the 20 August 1940 speech was changed when the movie was released on DVD in 2003. Onscreen, instead of the quote about "The Few," this Churchill quote appears: "This is not the end. It is not even the beginning of the end. But it is, perhaps, the end of the beginning," which was a reference to the Second Battle of El Alamein being a turning point in the war. The 2004 Special Edition, however, reverts to the quotation about The Few: "Never in the field of human conflict was so much owed by so many to so few."

Historical accuracy
The film is generally faithful to events, although merging some characters. Most historians doubt that Germany could realistically have won the battle of Britain, given Britain's superiority in aircraft production; its vast radar and surveillance infrastructure; the superior experience of its pilots; and the inherent advantage of fighting an air war over its home territory. While loss of pilots was an issue, Britain could supplement its ranks with experienced pilots who had fled Poland, France, Belgium, and other countries Germany had conquered, as well as pilots from the Dominions and volunteers from the United States. The German switch from attacking airfields to bombing cities was an effect, not a cause, of Germany's failure, as Germany had proved unable to destroy the airfields and other air infrastructure. That said, the British tended to overestimate German air strength and underestimate their own, so the film is not necessarily wrong for portraying the *perception* that Germany was close to winning the battle.

The film includes a sequence which relates the events of 15 August 1940, in which the Luftwaffe attempted to overwhelm fighter defences by simultaneous attacks on northern and southern England, the Luftwaffe reasoning that "even a Spitfire can't be in two places at once".  North East England was attacked by 65 Heinkel He 111s escorted by 34 Messerschmitt Bf 110s and RAF Driffield was attacked by 50 unescorted Junkers Ju. 88s. Out of 115 bombers and 35 fighters sent, 16 bombers and seven fighters were lost. As a result of these casualties, Luftflotte 5 did not appear in strength again in the campaign. 

The Robert Shaw character "Skipper" is based loosely on Squadron Leader Sailor Malan, a South African fighter ace and No. 74 Squadron RAF commander during the Battle of Britain. The scene in the operation room in which the British listen to their fighters' wireless transmissions relies on dramatic licence, as the operations room received information by telephone from the sector airfields. The scenes at the end, where the RAF pilots are seen suddenly idle and left awaiting the return of the Luftwaffe raids, rely similarly on licence; the fighting fizzled out through late September, although daylight raids continued for some weeks after the 15 September engagement. 31 October 1940 is regarded as the official end on the British side.

 The Edward Fox character "Pilot Officer Archie", is based on Ray Holmes of No. 504 Squadron RAF. On 15 September 1940, now known as "Battle of Britain Day", Holmes used his Hawker Hurricane to destroy a Dornier Do 17 bomber over London by ramming but at the cost of his own aircraft (and almost his own life). Holmes, making a head-on attack, found his guns inoperative. He flew his plane into the top-side of the German bomber, cutting off the rear tail section with his wing and causing the bomber to dive out of control and crash. The Dornier pilot, Feldwebel Robert Zehbe, bailed out, only to die later of wounds suffered during the attack, while the injured Holmes bailed out of his plane and survived.

As the RAF did not practise ramming as an air combat tactic, this was considered an impromptu manoeuvre and an act of selfless courage. Holmes was feted by the press as a war hero who saved Buckingham Palace. This event became one of the defining moments of the Battle of Britain and elicited a congratulatory note to the RAF from Queen Wilhelmina of the Netherlands who had witnessed the event. The ramming is depicted in the film, with considerable artistic licence.

The Susannah York character Section Officer Maggie Harvey is based on Felicity Peake who was a young Section Officer at Biggin Hill in 1940. Her reaction to the heavy raid resulting in the deaths of several WAAFs and the confrontation with Warrant Officer Warwick were based on real events.

The confrontation between Dowding and Keith Park and Trafford Leigh-Mallory is fictitious, though there were undoubted tensions between the two sides. The film does not mention that, following the Battle of Britain, Dowding and Park were replaced by Sholto Douglas and Leigh-Mallory, despite Dowding and Park having demonstrated that Leigh-Mallory's "Big Wing" strategy was unworkable.

One omission is at the end of the film, when casualties are listed.  The film does not mention losses by the Corpo Aereo Italiano, an Italian expeditionary force that took part, nor is its participation mentioned during the film. One anomalous entry in the list of pilots who served with the RAF is a Palestinian pilot described by the credits as Israeli, even though the State of Israel was only created in 1948. This referred to George Goodman, an ace born in Haifa while Palestine was under British administration, who was killed in action in 1941. In the combat scenes there was no attempt to recreate tracer rounds.

Göring's train in the film is Spanish rather than French (the RENFE markings are just visible on its tender) and the steam locomotive shown did not come into service on Spanish National Railways (RENFE) until 1951.

The character Major Falke is based on Generalleutnant Adolf Galland, a famous ace during the Second World War, who did ask Reichsmarshall Göring for "an outfit of Spitfires for my squadron". Galland explained in his autobiography that his request was only a way to upset Göring, because he was "unbelievably vexed at the lack of understanding and stubbornness with the command (i.e. Göring) who gave us orders we could not execute". Galland did feel that the Spitfire was more manoeuvrable than the Bf 109, which he felt made it more suitable as a defensive fighter but he also states that "fundamentally I preferred the Bf 109". Galland was upset about the director's decision not to use the real names. While making the film, Galland was joined by his friend Robert Stanford Tuck.

During filming, Galland, who was acting as a German technical adviser, took exception to a scene where Kesselring is shown giving the Nazi salute, rather than the standard military salute. Journalist Leonard Mosley witnessed Galland spoiling the shooting and having to be escorted off the set. Galland subsequently threatened to withdraw from the production, warning "dire consequences for the film if the scene stayed in". When the finished scene was screened before Galland and his lawyer, he was persuaded to accept the scene after all.

Reported German losses during the battle derive from claims made and believed at the time. Subsequent research shows that these were substantial overestimates, resulting from, for example, multiple claims on the same downed aircraft. The actual number of German losses on 15 September was 56.

An RAF officer pilot with a disfigured face appears in a scene with Kenneth More and Susannah York. This is not an actor but retired Squadron Leader Bill Foxley, a trainee navigator with RAF Bomber Command during World War II who suffered severe burns following a crash. He was notable for the support he gave to other burns victims and for this film appearance that gave a wide audience some awareness of the facial burns suffered by World War II aircrew.

Musical score
As recounted in Mervyn Cooke's A History of Film Music (2008), the film has two musical scores. The first was written by Sir William Walton, then in his late 60s, and conducted by Malcolm Arnold, who also assisted Walton with the orchestration – notably the music accompanying the Blitz sequences, and some sections of "Battle in the Air", which may have involved some compositional "patches" by Arnold. Aside from the undoubted originality and impact of "The Battle in the Air" sequence, and an opening march (conducted at the sessions by Walton) which was described by a journalist present at its recording as "a grand patriotic tune to out-type and out-glory any that Sir William has yet written, whether for films or coronations", much of Walton's score involves parodies of the horncall from Wagner's Siegfried.

However, Arnold and David Picker – the uncle and nephew in charge of United Artists – insisted on having the music tracks sent to them in New York; their verdict on hearing the music, unaccompanied by the film, was that it was unsuitable and that a composer known to them should be hired to write a replacement score. The music department at United Artists furthermore objected that the score was too short to fill an LP recording which was intended to be marketed with the film. As a result, John Barry – who had scored several James Bond films – was approached, but he declined.

The job was accepted by Ron Goodwin, who also served as conductor. Producer S. Benjamin Fisz and actor Sir Laurence Olivier protested against this decision, and Olivier threatened to take his name from the credits. In the end, one segment of the Walton score, "Battle in the Air", which depicted the climactic air battles of 15 September 1940, was retained in the final cut, as well as a few bars of his march edited into the final scene before the credits roll. The Walton score for the battle sequence was played with no sound effects of aircraft engines or gunfire, giving the segment a transcendent, lyrical quality.

Prime Minister Edward Heath retrieved Walton's manuscript from United Artists in 1972, presenting it to the composer at Walton's 70th birthday party held at 10 Downing Street. Tapes of the Walton score were believed lost forever until being rediscovered in 1990 in the sound mixer's garage. Since then the score has been restored and released on compact disc. The option to watch the film with the complete Walton score was included on the Region 2 special edition DVD of the film, which was released in June 2004 and the Region A Blu-ray released on 3 June 2008.

Ron Goodwin's score opens with the "Luftwaffe March", later retitled "Aces High", in the style of a traditional German military march in 6/8 time.  The march places heavy emphasis on the "oom-pah" sound of tubas and lower-pitched horns on the first and second beats and has the glockenspiel double the horns in the melody. Because of the great length of this sequence, which shows a Luftwaffe general's inspection of a Heinkel squadron in occupied France, the "Aces High" has three separate bridges between choruses of the main theme, one of which recurs several times in a gently sentimental variation. Despite its origin in a representation of a tyrannical threat to democracy, the march has become a popular British march tune, like the Dambusters March. An adaptation was first played by a British military band in 1974 by the Corps of Drums of the Royal Pioneer Corps and is now frequently played at military parades and by marching bands in Northern Ireland. American radio personality and convicted Watergate conspirator G. Gordon Liddy used the march as bumper music on his syndicated radio programme.

Reporting on the film's premiere, The Times commented: "Handsomely shot, soberly put together, it is weighed down somewhat by a platitudinous score from Ron Goodwin. The only sequence of the rejected Walton score, the Battle in the Air, turned down allegedly because it was not long enough to fill an LP, is not perhaps vintage Walton, but at least lifts the film with moments of sharp excitement."

In 2004, both Ron Goodwin's and Sir William Walton's scores were released on a single CD for the first time - Goodwin's music occupied tracks 1 to 19, while Walton's was tracks 20 to 28.

Reception
In the United Kingdom, filming of the aerial battle scenes over London and the home counties had generated considerable interest. Pre-release publicity included the film's quad posters on prominent billboard locations and features in The Sunday Times magazine and local press. However, the film was released at a time when anti-war feeling stirred by the Vietnam War was running high, together with cynicism among post-war generations about the heroism of those who participated in the Battle of Britain.  The film's premiere was held at the Dominion Theatre in London on 15 September 1969 and was attended by 350 Battle of Britain veterans, including Air Chief Marshal Lord Dowding. 

It received mixed reviews in the UK and was not well received by American critics either. The Evening Standard called it "an absorbing rather than a stirring film", The Times noted that it was "a discreet mixture of all possible approaches, tastefully done, not unintelligent, eminently respectable, and for the most part deadly dull" while The Guardian was less impressed calling it "neither a very good movie nor a very formidable piece of history".  Vincent Canby wrote in The New York Times that, "Battle of Britain, which opened yesterday at the DeMille, 86th Street East and 34th Street East Theaters, is a homage to those airmen who, in 1940, broke the back of the threatened Nazi invasion. It is also one of those all-star non-movies, of a somewhat lower order than The Longest Day, that attempt to recapitulate history, but add nothing to one's understanding. The mixture of minor-key fiction and restaged fact is – for me, anyway – never particularly satisfying, since it is denied the prerogatives and possibilities of both the documentary and the fiction film."  In the Chicago Tribune, Gene Siskel stated, "We believe American film audiences are no longer impressed by casts of thousands and budgets of millions. Unfortunately, Harry Saltzman, who produced The Battle of Britain, disagrees. The film is a 12-thousand-megadollar bomb that features 100 vintage planes eating up 40 minutes of film. The film has absolutely no dramatic Interest in the other 93 minutes, and I challenge the notion that it is worth seeing just for the aerial sequences."

He later placed it on his list of the twenty worst films to have been released that year. Commenting on the audience reaction to the aerial footage, he remarked that "the planes had the only good lines in the film." Remarking on the same footage, Roger Ebert wrote that "the aerial scenes are allowed to run forever and repeat themselves shamelessly, until we're sure we saw that same Heinkel dive into the sea (sorry – the "drink") three times already. And the special effects aren't all that good for a movie that cost $12,000,000."  Battle of Britain currently scores a 67% rating on Rotten Tomatoes based on 9 reviews.

In its first two days in 11 cities in the UK, the film grossed $56,242. It was the number one film in the United Kingdom for a total of 14 weeks beginning 26 September 1969 (4 weeks), 7 November 1969 (7 weeks), 6 February 1970 (2 weeks) and finally 27 February 1970 (1 week).  After worldwide distribution, the film grossed just under $13 million according to Guy Hamilton in an interview on the two-disc DVD edition, but due to the large cost of production, the film lost $10 million, although home media sales finally moved it into profit.

The use of actual aircraft in flying sequences has led to a number of subsequent productions utilising stock footage derived from Battle of Britain. These productions include the films Adolf Hitler: My Part in his Downfall (1972), Carry On England (1976), Midway (1976), Baa Baa Black Sheep (television series 1979), Hope and Glory (1987), Piece of Cake (1988 ITV mini-series), No Bananas (BBC drama series 1996), Dark Blue World (2001), and First Light (BBC drama 2010). as well as the History Channel documentary The Extraordinary Mr Spitfire about the life of wartime test pilot Alex Henshaw (2007).

Merchandise
Both a hardcover and paperback book on the making of the movie were published in 1969.
A set of 66 bubble-gum collector cards to accompany the film was produced by Spitfire Productions.
Dinky Toys produced a pair of diecast model aircraft based on the film. A Spitfire Mk II (Dinky Toys 719) in 1/65 scale and Junkers Ju 87B Stuka (Dinky Toys 721) in 1/72 scale were released in special boxes with Battle of Britain logo on the box and photographs from the film included.

In popular culture
 The formative strategy war-game Empire was notably inspired by the RAF Fighter Command scenes in Battle of Britain in which staff move counters representing friendly and enemy aircraft and ships over the large map of Britain, from which tactical decisions are made by the air commanders.
 A fragment of the soundtrack of one of the dogfights is used on the album The Wall (1979) by Pink Floyd, immediately before the start of the track "Vera".
 Footage of Bf 109s exploding and crashing into the English Channel was inserted into the opening "Skeet Surfing" music video in the parody film Top Secret! (1984).
 Michael Caine appears in a spoken cameo role in the film Dunkirk (2017) as a Royal Air Force Spitfire pilot, as a nod to his role of RAF fighter pilot Squadron Leader Canfield in Battle of Britain.
 A running joke in James May's YouTube cooking show on the FoodTribe channel involves May (or others) quoting the film, particularly the lines "plenty of it" (usually also referring to a food item) and "flood the cowling".

See also
 Hawker Hurricane survivors
 Messerschmitt Bf 109 survivors
 Supermarine Spitfire survivors
 Battle of Britain II: Wings of Victory

References

Notes

Citations

Bibliography

 
 Cooke, Mervyn. A History of Film Music. Cambridge, UK: Cambridge University Press, 2008. .
 Crump, Bill. "Bandits on Film." FlyPast October 2007.
 Galland, Adolf. Die Ersten und die Letzten (The First and the Last) (in German). Munich: Franz Schneekluth-Verlag Darmstadt, First edition, 1953. .
 Galland, Adolf. The First and the Last: Germany's Fighter Force in WWII (Fortunes of War). South Miami, Florida: Cerberus Press, 2005. .
 Hankin, Raymond. "Filming the Battle." Flying Review International, Vol. 24, no. 2, October 1968.
 Kennedy, Michael. Portrait of Walton. Oxford, UK: Oxford University Press, 1989.
 MacCarron, Donald. "Mahaddie's Air Force." FlyPast September 1999. .
 Mackenzie, S. P. The Battle of Britain on Screen: 'The Few' in British Film and Television Drama. Edinburgh: Edinburgh University Press, 2007. .
 
 Prins, François. "Battle of Britain: Making an epic." FlyPast August 2009.
 Robinson, Anthony. RAF Squadrons in the Battle of Britain. London: Arms and Armour Press Ltd., 1987 (republished 1999 by Brockhampton Press). .
 Rudhall, Robert. "The Battle of Britain: The Movie, Part one: Opening Shots." Warbirds Worldwide, Number 5, Volume Two, No. 1, May 1988.
 Rudhall, Robert. "The Battle of Britain: The Movie, Part two: Lights, Camera's,(sic) Action." Warbirds Worldwide, Number 6, Volume Two, No. 2, August 1988.
 Rudhall, Robert J. Battle of Britain: The Movie. Worcester: Ramrod Productions, 2000.  .
 Schnepf, Ed, ed. "The Few: Making the Battle of Britain." Air Classics Vol. 6, No. 4, April 1970.
 Swern, Phil. The Guinness Book of Box Office Hits. Guinness Publishing Ltd, 1995. .
 Tierney, Neil. William Walton: His Life and Music. London: Robert Hale, 1984. .

External links

 
 
 
 
 Battle of Britain a 1969 Flight article

1969 war films
1969 films
Battle of Britain films
British aviation films
British war epic films
Cultural depictions of Adolf Hitler
Cultural depictions of Hermann Göring
1960s English-language films
Epic films based on actual events
Films about shot-down aviators
Films directed by Guy Hamilton
Films produced by Harry Saltzman
Films scored by Ron Goodwin
Films scored by William Walton
Films set in 1940
Films set in England
Films set in Germany
Films shot at Pinewood Studios
Films shot in Spain
United Artists films
World War II aviation films
World War II films based on actual events
1960s British films
Films set in bunkers